Petr Knop (born 12 May 1994) is a Czech cross-country skier.

He represented the Czech Republic at the FIS Nordic World Ski Championships 2015 in Falun.

Cross-country skiing results
All results are sourced from the International Ski Federation (FIS).

Olympic Games

Distance reduced to 30 km due to weather conditions.

World Championships

World Cup

Season standings

References

External links 
 

1994 births
Living people
Czech male cross-country skiers
Tour de Ski skiers
Cross-country skiers at the 2018 Winter Olympics
Cross-country skiers at the 2022 Winter Olympics
Olympic cross-country skiers of the Czech Republic
Cross-country skiers at the 2012 Winter Youth Olympics
Sportspeople from Jablonec nad Nisou